An affricate is a consonant that begins as a stop and releases as a fricative, generally with the same place of articulation (most often coronal). It is often difficult to decide if a stop and fricative form a single phoneme or a consonant pair.

Examples
For several places of articulation they are not attested at all.

Also less common are alveolar affricates where the fricative release is lateral, such as the  sound found in Nahuatl and Navajo.

Notation
Affricates are transcribed in the International Phonetic Alphabet by a combination of two letters, one for the stop element and the other for the fricative element. In order to show that these are parts of a single consonant, a tie bar is generally used. The tie bar appears most commonly above the two letters, but may be placed under them if it fits better there, or simply because it is more legible. Thus:

or
.

A less common notation indicates the release of the affricate with a superscript:

This is derived from the IPA convention of indicating other releases with a superscript. However, this convention is more typically used for a fricated release that is too brief to be considered a true affricate.

Though they are no longer standard IPA, ligatures are available in Unicode for eight common affricates
.
Any of these notations can be used to distinguish an affricate from a sequence of a stop plus a fricative, which exists in some languages such as Polish. However, in languages where there is no such distinction, such as English, the tie bars are commonly dropped.

In other phonetic transcription systems, such as the Americanist system, affricates may be transcribed with single letters.

Affricates vs. stop–fricative sequences
In some languages, affricates contrast phonemically with stop–fricative sequences:
Polish affricate  in czysta 'clean (f.)' versus stop–fricative  in trzysta 'three hundred'.
Klallam affricate  in k'ʷə́nc 'look at me' versus stop–fricative  in k'ʷə́nts 'he looks at it'.

The exact phonetic difference varies between languages. In stop–fricative sequences, the stop has a release burst before the fricative starts; but in affricates, the fricative element is the release. Phonologically, stop–fricative sequences may have a syllable boundary between the two segments, but not necessarily.

They often  contain a morpheme boundary (for example, nuts = nut + s). The English affricate phonemes  and  do not generally contain morpheme boundaries. Depending on dialect, English speakers may distinguish an affricate from a stop–fricative sequence in some contexts such as when the sequence occurs across syllable boundaries:

worst shin  → 
worse chin  → 

One acoustic criterion for differentiating affricates and stop–fricative sequences is the rate of amplitude increase of the frication noise, which is known as the rise time. Affricates have a short rise time to the peak frication amplitude; stop–fricative sequences have longer rise times (Howell & Rosen 1983, Johnson 2003, Mitani et al. 2006).

List of affricates
In the case of coronals, the symbols  are normally used for the stop portion of the affricate regardless of place.

The exemplar languages are ones that have been reported to have these sounds, but in several cases, they may need confirmation.

Sibilant affricates

The Northwest Caucasian languages Abkhaz and Ubykh both contrast sibilant affricates at four places of articulation: alveolar, postalveolar, alveolo-palatal and retroflex. They also distinguish voiceless, voiced, and ejective affricates at each of these.

When a language has only one type of affricate, it is usually a sibilant; this is the case in e.g. Arabic, most dialects of Spanish, and Thai.

Non-sibilant affricates

Lateral affricates

Trilled affricates

Pirahã and Wari' have a dental stop with bilabial trilled release .

Heterorganic affricates
Although most affricates are homorganic, Navajo and Chiricahua Apache have a heterorganic alveolar-velar affricate  (Hoijer & Opler 1938, Young & Morgan 1987, Ladefoged & Maddeison 1996, McDonough 2003, McDonough & Wood 2008, Iskarous, et al. 2012). Wari' and Pirahã have a voiceless dental bilabially trilled affricate [t̪ʙ̥] (see #Trilled affricates), Blackfoot has .

Phonation, coarticulation and other variants
The coronal and dorsal places of articulation attested as ejectives as well: . Several Khoisan languages such as !Xóõ are reported to have voiced ejective affricates, but these are actually pre-voiced: . Affricates are also commonly aspirated: , murmured: , and prenasalized: . Labialized, palatalized, velarized, and pharyngealized affricates are also common. Affricates may also have phonemic length, that is, affected by a chroneme, as in Italian and Karelian.

Phonological representation

In phonology, affricates tend to behave similarly to stops, taking part in phonological patterns that fricatives do not.  analyzes phonetic affricates as phonological stops. A sibilant or lateral (and presumably trilled) stop can be realized phonetically only as an affricate and so might be analyzed phonemically as a sibilant or lateral stop. In that analysis, affricates other than sibilants and laterals are a phonetic mechanism for distinguishing stops at similar places of articulation (like more than one labial, coronal, or dorsal place). For example, Chipewyan has laminal dental  vs. apical alveolar ; other languages may contrast velar  with palatal  and uvular . 
Affricates may also be a strategy to increase the phonetic contrast between aspirated or ejective and tenuis consonants.

In feature-based phonology, affricates are distinguished from stops by the feature [+delayed release].

Affrication 
Affrication (sometimes called affricatization) is a sound change by which a consonant, usually a stop or fricative, changes into an affricate. Examples include: 
 Proto-Germanic  > Modern English , as in chin (cf. German Kinn: Anglo-Frisian palatalization)
 Proto-Semitic  > Standard Arabic  in all positions, as in جمل  (camel) (cf. Aramaic: גמלא (gamlā'), Amharic: ግመል (gəmäl), and Hebrew: גמל (gamal)).
 Early Modern English  >  (yod-coalescence)
  >  in the High German consonant shift
  >  before  respectively in 16th-century Japanese
  >  word-initially in Udmurt

Pre-affrication 
In rare instances, a fricative–stop contour may occur. This is the case in dialects of Scottish Gaelic that have velar frication  where other dialects have pre-aspiration. For example, in the Harris dialect there is   'seven' and   'eight' (or).

See also

 Apical consonant
 Hush consonant
 Laminal consonant
 Index of phonetics articles

References

Sources

 
Hoijer, Harry; & Opler, Morris E. (1938). Chiricahua and Mescalero Apache texts. The University of Chicago publications in anthropology; Linguistic series. Chicago: University of Chicago Press.
Howell Peter; & Rosen, Stuart. (1983). Production and perception of rise time in the voiceless affricate/fricative distinction. The Journal of the Acoustical Society of America, 73 (3), 976–984.
Iskarous, K; McDonough, J; & Whalen, D. (2012) A gestural account of the velar fricative in Navajo. Journal of Laboratory Phonology 195-210.
Johnson, Keith. (2003). Acoustic & auditory phonetics (2nd ed.). Malden, MA: Blackwell Publishing.
 
Ladefoged, P. (1995) A Course in Phonetics (5th ed] Wadsworth, Inc 
Ladefoged, P; & Maddieson, I. (1996) Sounds of the Worlds Languages. Blackwell. 
Maddieson, Ian. (1984). Patterns of sounds. Cambridge University Press. 
McDonough, J (2003) The Navajo Sound System. Kluwer
McDonough, Joyce; & Wood, Valerie. (2008). The stop contrasts of the Athabaskan languages. Journal of Phonetics 36, 427-449.
Mitani, Shigeki; Kitama, Toshihiro; & Sato, Yu. (2006). Voiceless affricate/fricative distinction by frication duration and amplitude rise slope. The Journal of the Acoustical Society of America, 120 (3), 1600–1607.
 
Young, R & Morgan W. (1987) The Navajo Language. University of New Mexico Press.

External links
 Affricates in English

Manner of articulation